Aniella Nella Uwimana (born 17 November 1999) is a Burundian footballer who plays as a forward for Yanga Princess and Burundi women's national team.

References

External links 
 
 

1999 births
Living people
Burundian women's footballers
Women's association football forwards
Young Africans S.C. players
Burundi women's international footballers
Burundian expatriate footballers
Burundian expatriate sportspeople in Tanzania
Expatriate women's footballers in Tanzania